Per Lütken was a Danish glassmaker (1916–1998), most famous for his works at Holmegaard Glass Factory ("Holmegaard Glasværk" in Danish).

Lütken has set his signature on the history of Danish glassmaking, designing more than 3,000 pieces of glass for Holmegaard, a company for whom he worked from 1942 and until his death in 1998.

Amongst the best known series created by him are "Ideelle", "Skibsglas", "No. 5", "Selandia" and "Charlotte Amalie", all of which are still selling at high prices throughout the world. They are all regarded as design icons, and are found in many Danish homes to this day.

References 

1916 births
1998 deaths
Danish artists